Gods of War is the tenth album by heavy metal band Manowar, released in 2007. It is a concept album centered on Odin, King of Gods and primary god of war in the Norse Mythology. Gods of War was supposed to be the first of a series of concept albums dedicated to different war gods from various mythologies, but eventually its sequels were not released.

All the text on the booklet was written in the Runic alphabet. The booklet is available for download in the official Manowar site.  Cover art is painted by Ken Kelly. It is the last studio album to feature Manowar drummer Scott Columbus, who died in 2011.

Music of the album features symphonic metal influence, such as use of keyboard, choir and symphonic orchestra. Its close relationship with the four-opera cycle of Der Ring des Nibelungen by Richard Wagner is intended by wagnerian DeMaio, as shown by the booklet and recent interviews with Michael Custodis.

Track listing
All songs written by Joey DeMaio, except where noted.

"Die for Metal" is a metal anthem present on all copies of the album, but is listed as a bonus track because it is not part of the concept of the album.
"Die for Metal" is featured in the video game Brütal Legend.

Limited edition 
Besides the normal Jewel Case version, Gods of War was also released as a limited edition in an embossed metal slipcase containing a high-grade media book bound in leather. Furthermore, this limited edition features a bonus DVD with unreleased material about the making of the album and some special behind-the-scenes footage. A double-vinyl LP in a gatefold sleeve was also available.

Personnel
 Eric Adams – vocals
 Karl Logan – guitars, keyboards
 Joey DeMaio – four-string and eight-string bass, piccolo bass, keyboards, engineer, producer
 Scott Columbus – drums, percussion

Additional personnel
 Joe Rozler – orchestra and choir arrangement

Charts

End of year charts

Certifications

References

External links
 The Gods of War booklet available in pdf format

2007 albums
Manowar albums
Concept albums
Norse mythology in music
Albums with cover art by Ken Kelly (artist)